Jack Moehle is the Ed and Diane Wilson Presidential Professor of Structural Engineering at the University of California, Berkeley.

Education
Jack Moehle received his B.S. (1977), M.S. (1978), and Ph.D. (1980) in Civil Engineering from the University of Illinois.

Professional career
Moehle joined the University of California, Berkeley faculty in 1980. 
He was the director of the Earthquake Engineering Research Center at Berkeley from 1991 to 2001
In 1996 he became the founding director of the Pacific Earthquake Engineering Research Center, where he served until 2008.
He was elected a member of the National Academy of Engineering in 2014, for contributions to earthquake-resistant design and analysis of building structures, and for leadership in engineering education.

He is the author of the textbook, Seismic Design of Reinforced Concrete Buildings.

He has helped lead development of numerous codes and guidelines for the design and retrofit of structures, including Guidelines for Evaluation and Repair of Masonry and Concrete Walls (FEMA 306); Guidelines for Seismic Rehabilitation of Buildings (FEMA 273 and ASCE 356), Performance-Based Seismic Assessment Procedures (FEMA P-58), and Guidelines for Performance-Based Seismic Design of Tall Buildings (Tall Buildings Initiative, PEER).

Awards
Walter L. Huber Civil Engineering Research Prize, 1990
Fellow of the American Concrete Institute (ACI), 1990
The Annual Distinguished Lecture Award, Earthquake Engineering Research Institute, 2005
Distinguished Alumnus Award, Civil Engineering, University of Illinois, Urbana-Champaign, 2005
President's Award, Los Angeles Tall Buildings Structural Design Council, 2008.
Fellow, Structural Engineers Association of California (SEAOC), 2008
Award of Excellence (SEAONC), and Excellence Award (SEAOC) for Tall Buildings Initiative Guidelines, 2011
The Top 25 Newsmakers, Engineering News Record, 2011
Award in Excellence, for the Tall Buildings Initiative, WSSPC, 2013
National Academy of Engineering, 2014
Helmut Krawinkler Award, SEAONC, 2014
Fellow, Structural Engineers Institute, American Society of Civil Engineers, 2015
George W. Housner Medal, Earthquake Engineering Research Institute, 2020

References 

Members of the United States National Academy of Engineering
University of California, Berkeley faculty
Engineering academics
American civil engineers
Year of birth missing (living people)
Living people